DWZA is a callsign of two different broadcast stations:
 DWZA-TV, an ABS-CBN station in Botolan, Zambales
 DWZA-TV (GMA), a GMA Network station in Malilipot, Albay